Hakan Boyav (born January 10, 1964) is a Turkish actor.

He has participated in many serials and is also a theater director who has participated in many plays, films and series.

Theatre

As director 
 At: Julius Gyula Hay - Istanbul State Theatre - 2011
 Matruşka: Tuncer Cücenoğlu - Adana State Theatre - 2010
 Misery: Stephen King\Simon Moore - Adana State Theatre - 2009
 Rezervuar Kanişleri: Bülent Usta - İzmir State Theatre - 2009
 Ayyar Hamza: Ali Bey - Ankara State Theatre\Van State Theatre - 2008
 Rhinoceros: Eugène Ionesco - Antalya State Theatre - 2007
 The Lieutenant of Inishmore: Martin McDonagh - Van State Theatre - 2006
 Ada: Athol Fugard - Antalya State Theatre - 2006
 Perfect Wedding: Robin Hawdon - Konya State Theatre - 2005
 The Government Inspector: Nikolai Gogol - Erzurum State Theatre - 2005
 Sersem Kocanın Kurnaz Karısı: Haldun Taner - Van State Theatre - 2004
 Umut cinayeti: Burak Mikayil Uçar - Ankara State Theatre - 2002
 Rhinoceros: Eugène Ionesco - Ankara State Theatre - 1999
 Şişedeki Balık - Diyarbakır State Theatre
 Çiçek Çölü: Hakan Boyav - Dokuz Eylül University School of Fine Arts - 1987

As actor 
 Nafile Dünya: Oktay Arayıcı - Ankara State Theatre - 2003
 Çiçekleri Sarı Kıza Yedirdim: Nihat Genç - Ankara State Theatre - 2003
 The Dumb Waiter: Woody Allen - Ankara State Theatre - 2002
 Aşk Öldürür: Vladimir Volkoff - Ankara State Theatre - 1999
 Ziyaretçi: Éric-Emmanuel Schmitt - Ankara State Theatre - 1998
 At: Julius Gyula Hay - Ankara State Theatre - 1998
 Blood Wedding: Federico García Lorca - Ankara State Theatre - 1997
 Gilgamesh: Zeynep Avcı - Ankara State Theatre - 1996
 The Idiot: Fyodor Dostoevsky\Simon Gray - Ankara State Theatre - 1995
 The Got “Final”: Woody Allen - Ankara State Theatre - 1994
 Good: Cecil Philip Taylor - Ankara State Theatre - 1994
 Savaş Baba: Iakovos Kambanellis - Ankara State Theatre - 1994
 Sersem Kocanın Kurnaz Karısı: Haldun Taner - Antalya State Theatre - 1993
 Ayyar Hamza: Ali Bey - Diyarbakır State Theatre - 1988
 Şişedeki Balık

Filmography

References 

1964 births
Living people
People from Ödemiş
Turkish male film actors
Turkish male television actors
Turkish male stage actors
Turkish theatre directors